Patricroft is a suburb near Eccles, Greater Manchester, England.

History
Patricroft may derive its name from 'Pear-tree croft', or more likely, 'Patrick's Croft'. In 1836, Scottish engineer James Nasmyth, in partnership with Holbrook Gaskell, built the Bridgewater Foundry in Patricroft. Nasmyth chose Patricroft, located on the west side of Manchester, ‘because of the benefit of breathing pure air, realising that a healthy workforce is a more efficient workforce'. He named the works "Bridgewater Foundry" in memory of Canal Duke, the first canal maker in Britain. Bridgewater Foundry was located adjacent to the Bridgewater Canal and the Manchester to Liverpool railway line. The foundry soon expanded to become a major supplier of steam locomotives. During the First World War, the factory's production was mainly diverted to munitions work. At the start of the Second World War it became a Royal Ordnance Factory, producing shells, tanks and guns. The engineering works closed in 1989: the site is now part of a business and technology centre.

The area was part of the municipal borough of Eccles in Lancashire until 1974 when it was incorporated into Salford, Greater Manchester.

Churches
Christ Church
Christ Church on Liverpool Road is the Anglican Parish Church of Patricroft. Construction was begun by the Rev Samuel Dale, curate at Eccles and later first Vicar at Patricroft. The church was built to seat 750 worshippers and was designed by John Lowe, it was opened circa 1868.

Holy Cross
The Church of the Holy Cross at Patricroft Bridge is the Roman Catholic Parish Church of Patricroft. It was opened in 1961.

Patricroft Methodist Church
Patricroft Methodist Church (technically located in Peel Green) on the corner of Alexandra Road and Liverpool Road came into being from the merger of the Trinity Methodist Church and the Ebenezer Methodist Church in 1964. A new church was opened on the Trinity site in February 1972. Later the Barton Methodist Church and the Winton Methodist Churches merged in with them.

United Reformed Church
The URC have a church on Shakespeare Crescent and their North Western Synod on Franklin Street.

Transport
The district is served by Patricroft railway station, which was opened on 15 September 1830  by the Liverpool & Manchester Railway and is situated in Green Lane. A large steam locomotive running shed was situated immediately north of the line until closure in 1968.

Bus services in the area are provided by Arriva North West, Diamond Bus North West and Go North West. Routes are co-ordinated by Transport for Greater Manchester.

Notable people
Sir Edwin Alliott Verdon Roe was born in Patricroft in 1877. He was the first Englishman to make a powered flight (in 1908 at Brooklands), and the first Englishman to fly an all-British machine a year later, on Hackney Marshes. He founded the Avro company, one of the world's first aircraft manufacturers, in 1910. Humphrey Verdon Roe, his brother, was co-founder of Avro and also co-founder of the first birth control clinic in Britain with Marie Stopes. Frederick Powell, a WW1 flying ace, also was born in Patricroft.
The campaigning journalist and editor Harold Evans was born in Patricroft in 1928.

References

Areas of Greater Manchester
Geography of Salford
Eccles, Greater Manchester